Gravelotte is a small town situated in the east of the Limpopo province of South Africa.

Mining centre 10 km north-east of Leydsdorp and 52 km north-west of Hoedspruit. It was established in 1916 and named after the farm owned by a Prussian missionary who had fought in the European Battle of Gravelotte (1870–71).

Transport
Gravelotte is located on the R71 route, and Gravelotte railway station connects the town to Mica, Hoedspruit, Acornhoek and Kaapmuiden to the south, and connects to Tzaneen, Duiwelskloof and Soekmekaar to the north.

External links
http://www.sa-venues.com

References

Populated places in the Ba-Phalaborwa Local Municipality
Mining communities in South Africa